Spirit of America may refer to:

Transport
Spirit of America (automobile), land speed record-setting vehicles
Spirit of America, a book of photography by Ken Duncan
Spirit of America, the first B-2 Spirit bomber
Spirit of America, one of the Goodyear Blimps
Spirit of America (cruise ship), a cruise ship owned and operated by Cruise West
Spirit of America, a trimaran designed by Lock Crowther
"The Spirit of America", a Massachusetts license plate slogan, initially a tourism jingle during the 1980s

Music and film 
The Spirit of America, a 1963 documentary film
Spirit of America (The Beach Boys album), a 1975 compilation album
Spirit of America (Mormon Tabernacle Choir album), a recording by the Mormon Tabernacle Choir
"Spirit of America" (song), a 1963 song by The Beach Boys from their album Little Deuce Coupe

Other uses
Spirit of America (charity), a military non-profit based in the United States
Spirit of America Festival Point Mallard Park, Decatur, Alabama
a Goodyear GZ-20 blimp
the slogan of the U.S. commonwealth of Massachusetts

See also
 Country Music: The Spirit of America, a 2003 documentary film